Rosemary Willis, (born December 31, 1990) is an American beauty pageant titleholder from Chesapeake, Virginia who was named Miss Virginia 2012.

Biography
She won the title of Miss Virginia on June 30, 2012, when she received her crown from outgoing titleholder Elizabeth Crot. Willis's platform is "Get Moving Today for a Healthier Tomorrow" and she said she hoped to promote exercise and physical activity among young people during her year as Miss Virginia. Her competition talent was a vocal performance of "I Who Have Nothing." Willis is a 2009 graduate of Indian River High School, and is an alumna of the College of William & Mary, where she majored in government and minored in kinesiology. She represented Virginia at Miss America 2013 but did not place among the Top 16 semi-finalists.

References

External links

1990 births
Living people
American beauty pageant winners
College of William & Mary alumni
Miss America 2013 delegates
Miss Virginia winners
People from Chesapeake, Virginia